Paul James Crosby (January 21, 1989 – October 30, 2019) was an American basketball player. He was an honorable mention All-American college player at Mississippi Valley State University.

College
Crosby originally committed to the University of Toledo out of Holt High School in Holt, Michigan.  However, he failed to qualify academically and instead ended up at Navarro College, a junior college in Texas.  After junior college, he moved to Binghamton.  But his time at Binghamton would be short-lived, as he was one of five players dismissed in the wake of the Binghamton University basketball scandal prior to the start of the 2009–10 season.

He landed at Mississippi Valley State after sitting out the 2010–11 season as a transfer student.  He had a strong two years at MVSU, earning first team All-Southwest Athletic Conference (SWAC) honors both years.  As a senior in 2011–12, Crosby averaged 13.1 points and 7.4 rebounds per game and was named SWAC Player of the Year.  He led the Delta Devils to the 2012 NCAA Tournament and was named an honorable mention All-American by the Associated Press.

Professional
After going undrafted in the 2012 NBA draft, Crosby signed with Montevideo in Uruguay.  In December 2012, the league paused operations while investigating the shooting of two fans.  Crosby took this opportunity to move to Minas in Brazil, where he completed the 2012–13 season.

On November 1, 2013, Crosby was drafted in the seventh round of the 2013 NBA Development League Draft by the Maine Red Claws.  On November 4, 2013, his rights were traded to the Santa Cruz Warriors. On November 18, he was waived by the Warriors.

Crosby died in a truck crash near Portage, Indiana, on October 30, 2019.

References

External links
 Brazilian NBB profile
 Mississippi Valley State Delta Devils bio

1989 births
2019 deaths
American expatriate basketball people in Brazil
American expatriate basketball people in Chile
American expatriate basketball people in Uruguay
American men's basketball players
Basketball players from Michigan
Centers (basketball)
Minas Tênis Clube basketball players
Mississippi Valley State Delta Devils basketball players
Navarro Bulldogs basketball players
People from Holt, Michigan
Power forwards (basketball)
Road incident deaths in Indiana
Sportspeople from Lansing, Michigan